La Pulla is a Colombian political, satirical and opinion journalism program on YouTube, owned by the national newspaper El Espectador. It was created by María Paulina Baena, Juan Carlos Rincón, Daniel Salgar, Santiago La Rotta and Juan David Torres and is presented by Baena and Rincón.

History
La Pulla'''s YouTube channel began in April 2016. In a June 2016 interview with Semana, Maria Paulina Baena, presenter of the program, said that Juan Carlos Rincón, El Espectador opinion coordinator, was thinking of a video editorial with "a different tone"; she was contracted by El Espectador after receiving a mail which asked her to introduce herself in two castings. In the same interview, Baena said that she and her team, led by Rincón, thought of names for the program like Los Indignados or Los Emputados, but they selected La Pulla because that name "fit with the insolent and vehement tone we want".

In 2016, La Pulla uploaded a video called "Ahora resulta que si hay apagón va a ser culpa nuestra" (Now it turns out that, if there's a [national] power cut, it would be our fault) in the context of  caused by El Niño. The Colombian government made a response to the video called "La Contrapulla".

On the eve of the 2018 Colombian presidential election, La Pulla made a video called "Gustavo Petro NO merece ser presidente" (Gustavo Petro DOESN'T deserve to be president). The video was strongly criticized by the followers of La Pulla. One of the most notable criticisms to this video was made by the Colombian YouTuber Lalis Smil, who started the video saying that "When [La Pulla] says that [Petro] is a despot, selfish and more, it is just talking about his personal manner of being. I've seen Gustavo hugging indigenous [people], kids, recyclers. I don't think in any moment he has been acting like a despot, or hitting somebody".

On December 6, 2018, presenter at the time of a program called Los Puros Criollos, transmitted on the free-to-air Colombian public TV channel Señal Colombia, made a video with La Pulla called "ÚLTIMA HORA: la ley que van a aprobar a escondidas" (BREAKING NEWS: the law [they] will approve on the quiet) where they criticized the TIC law, a public law that, they stated, "would end with the public television in Colombia". A few hours after La Pulla published the video, Rivas reported on the social media website Twitter that Juan Pablo Bieri, business manager of RTVC (operator of Señal Colombia) at the time, decided to quit Los Puros Criollos from the Señal Colombia dayparting. The decision was understood by the fans of Los Puros Criollos and La Pulla as "a way to censor Rivas as punishment for participate in La Pulla video". After the furor, in January 2019, Bieri resigned as business manager of RTVC; the resignation was accepted by the Colombian president Iván Duque on February 1, 2019.

In 2020, La Pulla uploaded a video sponsored by Carros más Seguros called "¡CUIDADO! Nos están vendiendo carros peligrosos" (CAUTION! [The cars companies] are selling us dangerous cars) where they said that the Mazda 2 model sold in Colombia (one of the ten most sold cars in the country) did not meet the global minimal security standards for cars. Nobuyuki Sato, president of Mazda Colombia, sent a letter to La Pulla asking for an apology. In the letter, he stated that the Mazda 2 model shown in the video was sold in Mexico, not in Colombia. La Pulla, in answer to the letter, changed the description of the video by adding an apology clarifying that the Mazda 2 model shown in the video was not sold in Colombia, but in Mexico. The company responded a couple days after the La Pulla apology, stating that "For Mazda of Colombia, the security of their cars is a priority", showing the technical data of the Mazda 2 model in Colombia.

In March 2021, Cali's mayor Jorge Iván Ospina did several accusations against the program on Twitter after they released a video criticizing his administration, Ospina said he did not see the video before writing the accusations and he would not see it anyway, he explicitly said on a Tweet "I'm not gonna watch the such Pulla for my mental health". The program responded to Ospina saying that "He did not see the video, but he knows it has obloquies and calumnies".

 Reception 
Daniela Cristancho Serrano from Directo Bogotá, a magazine owned by the Pontifical Xavierian University, said that La Pulla "uses colloquial language, irony, and dramatization [for their videos]" and said that the team of the program is "irreverent."

The program, however, has been strongly criticized on social media. In an article published in April 2017 by Nathalia Acero in the section El librepensador of the website of the Universidad Externado de Colombia called "Lo malo, lo bueno y lo bien feo de La Pulla" (The bad, the good, and the very ugly of La Pulla), she states:

Despite criticism, La Pulla's YouTube channel enjoys broad popularity, with over 1.1 million subscribers and around 130 million views total (as of July, 2021).

 Awards 
(2016)  for Opinion and analysis in television''.

References 

Colombian news websites
YouTube channels